Copromorpha is a genus of moths in the family Copromorphidae.

Species 
 Copromorpha aeruginea 	Meyrick, 1917
 Copromorpha bryanthes Meyrick 1926
 Copromorpha cryptochlora Meyrick, 1930	
 Copromorpha dialithoma Diakonoff 1967
 Copromorpha efflorescens Meyrick 1906
 †Copromorpha fossilis Jarzembowski 1980 (extinct)
 Copromorpha gypsota Meyrick 1886
 Copromorpha hyphantria Diakonoff 1984
 Copromorpha kijimuna Nasu, Saito & Komai, 2004
 Copromorpha lichenitis (Turner, 1916) 
 Copromorpha lignisquama Diakonoff 1954
 Copromorpha macrolepis Diakonoff 1959
 Copromorpha mesobactris Meyrick, 1930
 Copromorpha metallistis Meyrick 1906
 Copromorpha mistharnis Diakonoff 1968
 Copromorpha myrmecias Meyrick 1930
 Copromorpha narcodes Meyrick 1916
 Copromorpha nesographa Meyrick 1926
 Copromorpha orthidias Meyrick 1927
 Copromorpha phaeosticta Turner 1916
 Copromorpha phytochroa Diakonoff 1953
 Copromorpha pleurophanes Meyrick 1905
 Copromorpha pyrrhoscia Meyrick 1935
 Copromorpha roepkei Diakonoff 1953
 Copromorpha smaragdarcha Diakonoff 1967
 Copromorpha tetrarcha Meyrick 1916
 Copromorpha thrombota Meyrick 1916

Former species
 Copromorpha prasinochroa Meyrick 1906

References

 Meyrick, 1886 . Trans. R. ent. Soc. Lond. 1886 : 281
 Natural History Museum Lepidoptera genus database
 Hasting Moths

External links
 images at boldsystems.org

Copromorphidae
Moth genera